William Gaston (1778–1844) was an American jurist and United States Representative from North Carolina.

William Gaston may also refer to:
 William Gaston (merchant) (1785–1837), prominent citizen of Savannah, Georgia
 William Gaston (Massachusetts politician) (1820–1894), 29th Governor of Massachusetts
 William A. Gaston (1859–1927), American lawyer, banker, and gubernatorial candidate
 William H. Gaston (1840–1927), American landowner and Confederate soldier from Texas
 SS William Gaston, a World War II Liberty ship named after the North Carolina Representative

See also
Bill Gaston (born 1953), Canadian novelist and playwright